is the debut single by Japanese singer Miki Matsubara, released on November 5, 1979. The song saw a resurgence in popularity in 2020, 41 years after its original release.

Composition and release 
Matsubara recorded "Mayonaka no Door" when she was 19 years old; two years prior to her debut, she had moved from her hometown of Osaka to Tokyo and performed in clubs in the city. Tetsuji Hayashi, the composer of the song, created a track that followed the emerging "new music" style that drew influences from Western music, a genre that would come to be known as city pop. The song's particular use of the English phrase, "Stay With Me", was noted by Billboard as grabbing "the interest of non-Japanese listeners" while paying homage to its Western influence.

In an interview with The Japan Times, Hayashi praised the upcoming singer's voice, saying: "I didn’t expect her to have a very mature voice, much more than her actual age, but it was jazzy... even sexy." The song itself is about a woman who wants her lover to stay with her, especially after having a memory of him from the previous night.

The song was commercially successful: it peaked at 28th on the Oricon Singles Chart and boosted the popularity of both Matsubara and Hayashi. While Matsubara would release a lot more music in her career, "Mayonaka no Door" is widely considered her greatest work.

Resurgence 
In late 2020, "Mayonaka no Door" saw a surge in popularity among international audiences. Billboard attributes this wave to Indonesian singer Rainych, who regularly covers Japanese songs. In October, Rainych uploaded a cover of "Mayonaka no Door" to her YouTube channel, resulting in the song gaining popularity in Indonesia, where it then spread to the rest of the world.

The song appeared on the popularity charts of music streaming services such as Spotify and Apple Music. Around the same time, the song was used in an internet trend on the video-sharing platform TikTok, where people played the song for their Japanese mothers and recorded their reaction as they recognized the melody.

On 4 February 2022, Tetsuji Hayashi, the composer of the song, during an interview with NHK, said that he believed the key to the song's resurgence was that people were used to streaming music. He also said, "This song was Miki Matsubara's debut, but I felt she had already perfected it as a singer. This kind of thing is not often the case."

Charts

See also 
 "Plastic Love", city pop song that saw a resurgence in 2017

References 

1979 debut singles
J-pop songs
Songs about heartache
Viral videos
Internet memes introduced in 2020